Andhare Alo may refer to:

 Andhare Alo (1922 film), directed by Sisir Bhaduri
 Andhare Alo (1957 film), directed by Haridas Bhattacharya